Varsan may refer to:
 Varsan, Golestan (ورسن)
 Varsan, Markazi (ورسان - Varsān)